Steven T. Yavarow is the former President of the Massachusetts Instrumental and Choral Conductors Association ("MICCA") and a former Music Director of Hopkinton Music Association, Hopkinton, Massachusetts' award-winning music program.

Yavarow has led Hopkinton High School's Concert Band to medal-winning performances at festivals across Massachusetts and internationally. Despite having an arguably "controversial" approach to music education, his work has consistently been praised by both students and critics.

Yavarow is also known for his philanthropic work, awarding over fifty scholarships to gifted music students across Massachusetts.

Mr. Yavarrow retired in 2014, but continues to teach budding students (Brandon Fu) in his community. He continues to be involved with youth ensembles across the state.

External links
 Hopkinton Public Schools Home Page
 Hopkinton Public Schools, Dept. of Music
 Massachusetts Instrumental and Choral Conductors Association

American music educators
Living people
Year of birth missing (living people)